Tabaqat-i Nasiri, named for Sultan Nasir-ud-Din, is an elaborate history of the Islamic world written in Persian by Minhaj-i-Siraj Juzjani and completed in 1260. Consisting of 23 volumes and written in a blunt straightforward style, Juzjani devoted many years to the creation of this book even providing references for his information. Although a large portion of the book is devoted to the Ghurids, it also contains a history of the predecessors in Ghazna before the Ghaznavid Sebuktigin took power. In compiling his Tabaqat i Nasiri, Juzjani used other books now lost; part of Baihaqi's reign of Sebuktigin, Abu'l-Qasim Imadi's Ta'rikh-i mujadwal and most likely Ibn Haisam's Qisas-i thani. Juzjani's "tabaqat" would initiate the form of writing for dynastic history in centuries to come.

Contents
The purpose of the Tabaqat-i Nasiri was to account for the Muslim dynasties that originated in Iran and Central Asia. It starts with the prophets and explains their piety and morality. This continues up to Abdullah, father of the prophet Muhammad, at which point a history of the prophet's life is told. Within his Tabaqat-i Nasiri, Juzjani tells of his religious views and his historiographical approach to Islam and Muslim rulers.

The Tabaqat-i Nasiri is the only source for the Khaljis rebellion in Bengal against the sultan of Delhi from 1229-1230.

Volumes
Volume XI: Is a history of the Ghaznavids from Sabuktigin to Khusrau Malik.
Volume XVII: Gives an historical account of the Ghurids and their rise to power in 1215 to their end with Sultan Alauddin.
Volume XIX: Is a history of the Ghurid sultans Saifuddin Suri to Qutbuddin Aibek.
Volume XX: Is a history of Aibek and the first four rulers of Laknauti until their demise by Iltutmish in 1236.
Volume XXII: Is a biographical volume of courtiers, generals and provincial governors within the sultanate from 1227 until the early history of wazir Balban.
Volume XXIII: Gives indepth information concerning Genghis Khan, his successors up to 1259, and the atrocities committed by the Mongols against Muslim.

Notes

References

External links
 Tabaqat-i Nasiri of Juzjani, books at Archive.org.
 Minhaj-i-Siraj, Jowzjāni at Iranica online.
 Tabaqat-i Nasiri at Iranica online.
 Tabaqat-i-Nasiri at Banglapedia.

Ghaznavid Empire
Mamluk dynasty (Delhi)
1260 books
History books about Iran
Persian-language books
History books about India
Historiography of India
13th-century Indian books
Ghurid dynasty
History of the Mongol Empire
Delhi Sultanate
Books about Delhi
Indian chronicles